Filip Šnejdr (born 16 April 1995) is a Czech middle-distance runner specialising in the 800 metres. He represented his country in the 4 × 400 metres relay at the 2018 World Indoor Championships finishing fifth. He earlier won a bronze medal in the same event at the 2017 Summer Universiade.

International competitions

Personal bests
Outdoor
400 metres – 46.69 (Prague 2018)
800 metres – 1:45.56 (Nancy 2018)
1000 metres – 2:21.06 (Prague 2017)
1500 metres – 3:58.30 (Prague 2017)
Indoor
200 metres – 21.92 (Prague 2018)
400 metres – 47.05 (Prague 2018)
800 metres – 1:46.99 (Vienna 2018)
1000 metres – 2:25.12 (Prague 2016)

References

1995 births
Living people
Czech male middle-distance runners
Universiade medalists in athletics (track and field)
Universiade bronze medalists for the Czech Republic
European Games competitors for the Czech Republic
Athletes (track and field) at the 2019 European Games
Czech Athletics Championships winners
Competitors at the 2019 Summer Universiade
Medalists at the 2017 Summer Universiade